The infinity sign or infinity symbol is commonly typed as ,  or ∞.

Infinity sign may also refer to
Infinity Sign, a 2018 posthumous compilation album of music by Stephen Huss
"Infinity Sign" (stylised as ""), a song by Coldplay from their 2021 album Music of the Spheres

See also

 Infinity (disambiguation)